The 1970 Prince Edward Island general election was held on May 11, 1970.

The incumbent Liberal government of Alex Campbell was easily re-elected, gaining a total of 7.9% in the popular vote on the Tories, who dropped by the identical amount, as only the two parties ran any candidates in both the 1970 and 1966 elections.

Jean Canfield, the first woman ever elected to the Legislative Assembly of Prince Edward Island, was a victorious candidate in 1st Queens in this election.

Party standings

Members elected

The Legislature of Prince Edward Island had two levels of membership from 1893 to 1996 - Assemblymen and Councillors. This was a holdover from when the Island had a bicameral legislature, the General Assembly and the Legislative Council.

In 1893, the Legislative Council was abolished and had its membership merged with the Assembly, though the two titles remained separate and were elected by different electoral franchises. Assembleymen were elected by all eligible voters of within a district. Before 1963, Councillors were only elected by landowners within a district, but afterward were elected in the same manner as Assemblymen.

Kings

Prince

Queens

Sources

Further reading
 

1970 elections in Canada
Elections in Prince Edward Island
1970 in Prince Edward Island
May 1970 events in Canada